George Glenn Jones (September 12, 1931 – April 26, 2013) was an American country musician, singer, and songwriter. He achieved international fame for his long list of hit records, including his best-known song "He Stopped Loving Her Today", as well as his distinctive voice and phrasing. For the last two decades of his life, Jones was frequently referred to as the greatest living country singer. Country music scholar Bill Malone writes, "For the two or three minutes consumed by a song, Jones immerses himself so completely in its lyrics, and in the mood it conveys, that the listener can scarcely avoid becoming similarly involved." The shape of his nose and facial features earned Jones the nickname "The Possum".  Jones has been called "The Rolls-Royce of Country Music" and had more than 160 chart singles to his name from 1955 until his death in 2013.

Born in Texas, Jones first heard country music when he was seven, and was given a guitar at the age of nine. His earliest influences were Roy Acuff and Bill Monroe, although the artistry of Hank Williams and Lefty Frizzell would crystallize his vocal style. He married his first wife, Dorothy Bonvillion, in 1950, and was divorced in 1951. He served in the United States Marine Corps and was discharged in 1953. He married Shirley Ann Corley in 1954. In 1959, Jones recorded "White Lightning", written by The Big Bopper, which launched his career as a singer. His second marriage ended in divorce in 1968; he married fellow country music singer Tammy Wynette a year later. Years of alcoholism compromised his health and led to his missing many performances, earning him the nickname "No Show Jones". After his divorce from Wynette in 1975, Jones married his fourth wife, Nancy Sepulvado, in 1983 and became sober for good in 1999. Jones died in 2013, aged 81, from hypoxic respiratory failure.

Life and career

Early years (1931–1953)

George Glenn Jones was born on September 12, 1931, in Saratoga, Texas, and was raised in Colmesneil, Texas, with his brother and five sisters in the Big Thicket region of southeast Texas. His father, George Washington Jones, worked in a shipyard and played harmonica and guitar, while his mother, Clara (née Patterson), played piano in the Pentecostal Church on Sundays. During his delivery, one of the doctors dropped Jones and broke his arm. When he was seven, his parents bought a radio, and he heard country music for the first time. Jones recalled to Billboard in 2006 that he would lie in bed with his parents on Saturday nights listening to the Grand Ole Opry and insist that his mother wake him if he fell asleep so he could hear Roy Acuff or Bill Monroe. In his autobiography I Lived To Tell It All, Jones explains that the early death of his sister Ethel spurred on his father's drinking problem, and by all accounts, George Washington Jones could be physically and emotionally abusive to his wife and children when he drank. In the book George Jones: The Life and Times of a Honky Tonk Legend, Bob Allen recounts how George Washington Jones would return home in the middle of the night with his cronies roaring drunk, wake up a terrified George Glenn Jones, and demand that he sing for them or face a beating. In a CMT episode of Inside Fame dedicated to Jones's life, country music historian Robert K. Oermann marveled, "You would think that it would make him not a singer, because it was so abusively thrust on him. But the opposite happened; he became a chronic singer. He became someone who had to sing."  In the same program, Jones admitted that he remained ambivalent and resentful towards his father up until the day he died and observed in his autobiography, "The Jones family makeup doesn't sit well with liquor...Daddy was an unusual drinker. He drank to excess, but never while working, and he probably was the hardest working man I've ever known."  His father bought him his first guitar at age nine and he learned his first chords and songs at church, and  several photographs show a young George busking on the streets of Beaumont.
 
He left home at 16 and went to Jasper, Texas, where he sang and played on the KTXJ radio station with fellow musician Dalton Henderson. From there, he worked at the KRIC radio station. During one such afternoon show, Jones met his idol, Hank Williams ("I just stared," he later wrote). In the 1989 video documentary Same Ole Me, Jones admitted, "I couldn't think or eat nothin' unless it was Hank Williams, and I couldn't wait for his next record to come out. He had to be, really, the greatest."  He married his first wife Dorothy Bonvillion in 1950, but they divorced in 1951. He was enlisted in the United States Marines until his discharge in 1953. He was stationed in San Jose, California, for his entire service.

First recordings (1954–1957)

Jones married Shirley Ann Corley in 1954. His first record, the self-penned "No Money in This Deal", was recorded on January 19, and appeared in February on Starday Records, beginning the singer's association with producer and mentor H.W. "Pappy" Daily. The song was actually cut in Starday Records' co-founder Jack Starnes's living room and produced by Starnes. Jones also worked at KTRM (now KZZB) in Beaumont around this time. Deejay Gordon Baxter told Nick Tosches that Jones acquired the nickname "possum" while working there: "One of the deejays there, Slim Watts, took to calling him George P. Willicker Picklepuss Possum Jones. For one thing, he cut his hair short, like a possum's belly. He had a possum's nose and stupid eyes, like a possum."  During his early recording sessions, Daily admonished Jones for attempting to sound too much like his heroes Hank Williams and Lefty Frizzell. In later years, Jones would have little good to say about the music production at Starday, recalling to NPR in 1996 that "it was a terrible sound. We recorded in a small living room of a house on a highway near Beaumont. You could hear the trucks. We had to stop a lot of times because it wasn't soundproof, it was just egg crates nailed on the wall and the big old semi trucks would go by and make a lot of noise and we'd have to start over again."  Jones's first hit came with "Why Baby Why" in 1955. That same year, while touring as a cast member of the Louisiana Hayride, Jones met and played shows with Elvis Presley and Johnny Cash. "I didn't get to know him that well," Jones said of Presley to Nick Tosches in 1994. "He stayed pretty much with his friends around him in his dressing room. Nobody seemed to get around him much any length of time to talk to him."  Jones would, however, remain a lifelong friend of Johnny Cash. Jones was invited to sing at the Grand Ole Opry in 1956.

With Presley's explosion in popularity in 1956, pressure was put on Jones to cut a few rockabilly sides, and he reluctantly agreed. His heart was never in it, however, and he quickly regretted the decision; in his autobiography, he joked, "During the years, when I've encountered those records, I've used them for Frisbees."  He explained to Billboard in 2006: "I was desperate. When you're hungry, a poor man with a house full of kids, you're gonna do some things you ordinarily wouldn't do. I said, 'Well, hell, I'll try anything once.'  I tried 'Dadgum It How Come It' and 'Rock It', a bunch of shit. I didn't want my name on the rock and roll thing, so I told them to put Thumper Jones on it and if it did something, good, if it didn't, hell, I didn't want to be shamed with it."  Jones went on to say he unsuccessfully attempted to buy all the masters to keep the cuts from surfacing later, which they did.

Jones moved to Mercury in 1957. In early 1957, Jones teamed up with singer Jeannette Hicks, the first of several duet partners he would have over the years, and enjoyed yet another top-10 single with "Yearning". Starday Records merged with Mercury that same year, and Jones scored high marks on the charts with his debut Mercury release of "Don't Stop the Music". Meanwhile, Jones was travelling the black-top roads in a 1940s Packard with his name and phone number emblazoned on the side. Although he was garnering a lot of attention and his singles were making very respectable showings on the charts, Jones was still playing the "blood bucket" circuit of honky-tonks that dotted the rural countryside.

Commercial breakout (1959–1964)

In 1959, Jones had his first number one on the Billboard country chart with "White Lightnin'", ironically a more authentic rock and roll sound than his half-hearted rockabilly cuts. In the Same Ole Me retrospective, Johnny Cash insisted, "George Jones woulda been a really hot rockabilly artist if he'd approached it from that angle. Well, he was, really, but never got the credit for it."  "White Lightnin'" was written by J. P. Richardson, better known as the Big Bopper. In I Lived To Tell It All, Jones confessed that he showed up for the recording session under the influence of a great deal of alcohol and it took him about 80 takes just to record his vocals.

One aspect of Jones's early career was his success as a songwriter; he wrote or co-wrote many of his biggest hits during this period, several of which have become standards, such as "Window Up Above" (later a smash for Mickey Gilley in 1975) and "Seasons of My Heart" (a hit for Johnny Cash and also recorded by Willie Nelson and Jerry Lee Lewis). Jones wrote "Just One More" (also recorded by Cash), "Life To Go" (a top-five hit for Stonewall Jackson in 1959), "You Gotta Be My Baby", and "Don't Stop The Music" on his own and had a hand in writing "Color of the Blues" (covered by Loretta Lynn and Elvis Costello), "Tender Years", and "Tall, Tall Trees" (co-written with Roger Miller). Jones's most frequent songwriting collaborator was his childhood friend Darrell Edwards.

Jones signed with United Artists in 1962, and immediately scored one of the biggest hits of his career, "She Thinks I Still Care". His voice had grown noticeably deeper during this period, and he began cultivating the singing style that became uniquely his own. During his stint with UA, Jones recorded tribute albums to Hank Williams and Bob Wills, and cut an album of duets with Melba Montgomery, including the hit "We Must Have Been Out of Our Minds". Jones was also well on his way to gaining a reputation as a notorious hell-raiser. In his Rolling Stone tribute, Merle Haggard recalls:

"I met him at the Blackboard Café in Bakersfield, California, which was the place to go in '61. He was already famous for not showing up or showing up drunk, and he showed up drunk. I was onstage – I think I was singing Marty Robbins' 'Devil Woman' – and he kicked the doors of the office open and said 'Who the fuck is that?'  It was one of the greatest compliments of my entire life when George Jones said I was his favorite country singer...In 1967, I released a ballad called "I Threw Away The Rose" and he was so impressed he actually jumped ship and left his tour, rented a Lear Jet and came to Amarillo, Texas. He told me my low note changed his life. "

On tour, Jones was always backed by the Jones Boys. Like Buck Owens's Buckaroos and Merle Haggard's Strangers, Jones worked with many musicians who were great talents in their own right, including Dan Schafer, Hank Singer, Brittany Allyn, Sonny Curtis, Kent Goodson, Bobby Birkhead, and Steve Hinson. In the 1980s and 1990s, bass player Ron Gaddis served as the Jones Boys' bandleader and sang harmony with Jones in concert. Lorrie Morgan (who married Gaddis) also toured as a backup singer for Jones in the late 1970s and early 1980s. Johnny Paycheck was the Jones Boys' bass player in the 1960s before going on to his own stardom in the 1970s.

Alcoholism and decline (1964–1979) 

In 1964, Pappy Daily secured a new contract with Musicor records. For the rest of the 1960s, Jones would score only one number one (1967's "Walk Through This World With Me"), but he practically owned the country music charts throughout the decade. Significant hits include "Love Bug" (a nod to Buck Owens and the Bakersfield sound), "Things Have Gone to Pieces", "The Race Is On", "My Favorite Lies", "I'll Share My World with You", "Take Me" (a song he co-wrote and would later record with Tammy Wynette), "A Good Year for the Roses", and "If My Heart Had Windows". By this point, Jones's singing style had evolved from the full-throated, high lonesome sound of Hank Williams and Roy Acuff on his early Starday records to the more refined, subtle style of Lefty Frizzell. In a 2006 interview with Billboard, Jones acknowledged the fellow Texan's influence on his idiosyncratic phrasing: "I got that from Lefty. He always made five syllables out of one word."

Jones's binge drinking and use of amphetamines on the road caught up to him in 1967, and he had to be admitted into a neurological hospital to seek treatment for his drinking. Jones would go to extreme lengths for a drink if the thirst was on him. Perhaps the most famous drinking story concerning Jones occurred while he was married to his second wife Shirley Corley. Jones recalled Shirley making it physically impossible for him to travel to Beaumont, located 8 miles away, to buy liquor. Because Jones would not walk that far, she would hide the keys to each of their cars they owned before leaving. She did not, however, hide the keys to the lawn mower. Upset, Jones walked to the window and looked out over his property. He later described his thoughts in his memoir: "There, gleaming in the glow, was that ten-horsepower rotary engine under a seat. A key glistening in the ignition. I imagine the top speed for that old mower was five miles per hour. It might have taken an hour and a half or more for me to get to the liquor store, but get there I did." Years later Jones comically mocked the incident by making a cameo in the video for "All My Rowdy Friends Are Coming Over Tonight" by Hank Williams Jr. He also parodied the episode in the 1993 video for "One More Last Chance" by Vince Gill and in his own music video for the single "Honky Tonk Song" in 1996. Curiously, in her 1979 autobiography Stand By Your Man, Tammy Wynette claims the incident occurred while she was married to Jones, maintaining that she woke up at one o'clock in the morning to find her husband gone: "I got into the car and drove to the nearest bar 10 miles away. When I pulled into the parking lot, there sat our rider-mower right by the entrance. He'd driven that mower right down a main highway... He looked up and saw me and said, ‘Well, fellas, here she is now. My little wife, I told you she'd come after me.’"

Jones became aware of Tammy Wynette because their tours were booked by the same agency and their paths sometimes crossed after Wynette's first minor hit "Apartment #9" in 1966, which was written by Johnny Paycheck. Wynette was married to songwriter Don Chapel, who was also the opening act for her shows at the time. The three became friends, but eventually Jones took more than a passing fancy to Wynette, who was 11 years his junior and grew up listening to all of his records. According to his autobiography, Jones went to their house for supper, and while she was fixing the meal, Wynette and Chapel got into a heated exchange with Chapel calling his wife "a son of a bitch."  Jones wrote: "I felt rage fly all over me. I jumped from my chair, put my hands under the dinner table, and flipped it over. Dishes, utensils, and glasses flew in all directions. Don and Tammy's eyes got about as big as the flying dinner plates." Jones professed his love for Wynette on the spot and the couple married in 1969.

They began touring together, and Jones bought out his contract with Musicor so he could record with Tammy and her producer Billy Sherrill on Epic Records (the singer had split with longtime producer Pappy Daily on acrimonious terms). Jones and Wynette became known as "Mr. & Mrs. Country Music" in the early 1970s, scoring several big hits, including "We're Gonna Hold On", "Let's Build A World Together", "Golden Ring", "Near You", and "(We're Not) The Jet Set". When asked about recording Jones and Wynette, Sherill told Dan Daley in 2002, "It did increase my scotch intake some. We started out trying to record the vocals together, but George drove Tammy crazy with his phrasing. He never, ever did it the same way twice. He could make a five-syllable word out of 'church.' Finally, Tammy said, 'Record George and let me listen to it, and then do my vocal after we get his on tape.' Tammy was a very quick study."

In October 1970, shortly after the birth of their only child Tamala Georgette, Jones was straitjacketed and committed to a padded cell at the Watson Clinic in Lakeland, Florida, after a drunken bender; he was kept there to detoxify for 10 days before being released with a prescription for Librium. Jones managed longer stretches of sobriety with Wynette than he had enjoyed in years, but as the decade wore on, his drinking and erratic behavior worsened, leading to the couple's divorce in 1976. Jones accepted the responsibility for the failure of the marriage, but vehemently denied Wynette's allegations in her autobiography that he beat her and fired a shotgun at her. Remarkably, Jones and Wynette continued playing shows and drawing crowds in the years after their divorce, as fans began to see their songs mirroring their stormy relationship. In 1980, they recorded the album Together Again and scored a hit with "Two Story House".  (In the 2019 Ken Burns documentary Country Music, Sherrill remembered this time by comparing Jones and Wynette to "two wounded animals.")  Jones also spoke publicly about his hopes for a reconciliation, and would jokingly reference Tammy in some of his songs – during performances of his 1981 hit "If Drinkin' Don't Kill Me (Her Memory Will)" he would sing "Tammy's memory will" – but the recrimination continued unabated. After years of sniping, Jones and Wynette appeared to make peace in the 1990s, recording a final album, One, and even touring together again before Wynette's death in 1998. In 1995, Jones told Country Weekly, "Like the old saying goes, it takes time to heal things and they've been healed quite a while."

Jones's pairing with Billy Sherrill at Epic Records came as a surprise to many; Sherrill and business partner Glenn Sutton are regarded as the defining influences of the countrypolitan sound, a smooth amalgamation of pop and country music that was popular during the late 1960s and throughout the 1970s, a far cry from George's honky-tonk roots. Despite a shaky start, the success that Sherrill had with Jones proved to be his most enduring; although Billboard chart statistics show that Sherrill had his biggest commercial successes with artists such as Wynette and Charlie Rich, with Jones, Sherrill had his longest-lasting association. In Sherrill, Jones found what Andrew Meuller of Uncut described as "the producer capable of creating the epically lachrymose arrangements his voice deserved and his torment demanded...He summoned for Jones the symphonies of sighing strings that almost made the misery of albums like 1974's The Grand Tour and 1976's Alone Again sound better than happiness could possibly feel."  In 1974, they scored a number-one hit with the instant classic "The Grand Tour" and followed that with "The Door" ("I've heard the sound of my dear old mother cryin'/and the sound of the train that took me off to war"), another number-one smash. Unlike most singers, who might have been overwhelmed by the string arrangements and background vocalists Sherrill sometimes employed on his records, Jones's voice, with its at times frightening intensity and lucid tone, could stand up to anything. While Jones wrote fewer songs himself – songwriters had been tripping over themselves pitching songs to him for years – he still managed to co-write several, such as "What My Woman Can't Do" (also recorded by Jerry Lee Lewis), "A Drunk Can't Be A Man", the harrowing "I Just Don't Give a Damn" (perhaps the greatest "lost classic" in the entire Jones catalogue), and "These Days (I Barely Get By)", which he had written with Wynette.

In the late 1970s, Jones spiraled out of control. Already drinking constantly, a manager named Shug Baggot introduced him to cocaine before a show because he was too tired to perform. The drug increased Jones's already considerable paranoia. During one drunken binge, he shot at, and very nearly hit, his friend and occasional songwriting partner Earl "Peanutt" Montgomery after Montgomery had quit drinking after finding religion. He was often penniless and acknowledged in his autobiography that Waylon Jennings and Johnny Cash came to his financial aid during this time. Jones also began missing shows at an alarming rate and lawsuits from promoters started piling up. In 1978, owing Wynette $36,000 in child support and claiming to be $1 million in debt, he filed for bankruptcy. Jones appeared incoherent at times, speaking in quarrelling voices that he would later call "the Duck" and "the Old Man". In his article "The Devil In George Jones", Nick Tosches states, "By February 1979, he was homeless, deranged, and destitute, living in his car and barely able to digest the junk food on which he subsisted. He weighed under a hundred pounds, and his condition was so bad that it took him more than two years to complete My Very Special Guests, an album on which Willie Nelson, Linda Ronstadt, Elvis Costello, and other famous fans came to his vocal aid and support. Jones entered Hillcrest Psychiatric Hospital in Birmingham, Alabama. Upon his release in January 1980, the first thing he did was pick up a six-pack."

Jones often displayed a sheepish, self-deprecating sense of humor regarding his dire financial standing and bad reputation. In June 1979, he appeared with Waylon Jennings on Ralph Emery's syndicated radio program, and at one point Jennings cracked, "It's lonely at the top."  A laughing Jones replied, "It's lonely at the bottom, too!  It's real, real lonely, Waylon."  Despite his chronic unreliability, Jones was still capable of putting on a captivating live show. On Independence Day, 1976, he appeared at Willie Nelson's Fourth of July Picnic in Gonzales, Texas, in front of 80,000 younger, country-rock oriented fans. A nervous Jones felt out of his comfort zone and nearly bolted from the festival, but went on anyway and wound up stealing the show. The Houston Post wrote, "He was the undisputed star of this year's Willie Nelson picnic...one of the greatest."  Penthouse called him "the spirit of country music, plain and simple, its Holy Ghost". The Village Voice added, "As a singer he is as intelligent as they come, and should be considered for a spot in America's all-time top ten."  Jones began missing more shows than he made, however, including several highly publicized dates at the Bottom Line club in New York City. Former vice president of CBS Records Rick Blackburn recalls in the 1989 video Same Ole Me that the event had been hyped for weeks, with a lot of top press and cast members from Saturday Night Live planning to attend. "We'd made our plans, travel arrangements, and so forth. George excused himself from my office, left – and we didn't see him for three weeks. He just did not show up."  Much like Hank Williams, Jones seemed suspicious of success and furiously despised perceived slights and condescension directed towards the music that he loved so dearly. When he finally played the Bottom Line in 1980, the New York Times called him "the finest, most riveting singer in country music."

Comeback (1980–1990)

By 1980, Jones had not had a number-one single in six years, and many critics began to write him off. However, the singer stunned the music industry in April when "He Stopped Loving Her Today" was released and shot to number one on the country charts, remaining there for 18 weeks. The song, written by Bobby Braddock and Curly Putman, tells the story of a man whose lover leaves him, but he vows to love her until he dies in hopes that she returns; she eventually returns, along with the singer, at the man's funeral, described in poetic terms. Jones's interpretation, buoyed by his delivery of the line "first time I'd seen him smile in years," gives it a mournful, gripping realism. It is consistently voted as one of the greatest country songs of all time, along with "I'm So Lonesome I Could Cry" by Hank Williams and "Crazy" by Patsy Cline. Jones, who personally hated the song and considered it morbid, ultimately gave the song credit for reviving his flagging career, stating, "a four-decade career had been salvaged by a three-minute song." Jones earned the Grammy Award for Best Male Country Vocal Performance in 1980. The Academy of Country Music awarded the song Single of the Year and Song of the Year in 1980. It also became the Country Music Association's Song of the Year in both 1980 and 1981.

The success of "He Stopped Loving Her Today" led CBS Records to renew Jones's recording contract and sparked new interest in the singer. He was the subject of an hour-and-a-quarter-long HBO television special entitled George Jones: With a Little Help from His Friends, which had him performing songs with Waylon Jennings, Elvis Costello, Tanya Tucker, and Tammy Wynette, among others. Jones continued drinking and using cocaine, appearing at various awards shows to accept honors for "He Stopped Loving Her Today" obviously inebriated, like when he performed "I Was Country When Country Wasn't Cool" with Barbara Mandrell at the 1981 Country Music Association Awards. He was involved in several high-speed car chases with police, which were reported on the national news, and one arrest was filmed by a local TV crew; the video, which is widely available online, offers a glimpse into Jones's alter ego when drinking, as he argues with the police officer and lunges at the camera man. Conversely, when sober, Jones was known to be friendly and down to earth, even shy. In a 1994 article on Jones, Nick Tosches remarked that when he first interviewed the singer in April 1976, "One could readily believe the accounts by those who had known him for years: that he had not changed much at all and that he had been impervious to fame and fortune."  In an unusually unguarded self-appraisal in 1981, the singer told Mark Rose of The Village Voice, "I don't show a lot of affection. I have probably been a very unliked person among family, like somebody who was heartless. I saved it all for the songs. I didn't know you were supposed to show that love person to person. I guess I always wanted to, but I didn't know how. The only way I could would be to do it in a song."  Years later he commented to the Christian Broadcasting Network's Scott Ross about himself, "I think you're mad at yourself, I think that you're sayin' to yourself 'You don't deserve this. You don't deserve those fans. You don't deserve makin' this money.'  And you're mad at yourself. And you beat up on yourself by drinkin' and losing friends that won't put up with that...It's just one terrible big mess you make out of your life."  In 1982, Jones recorded the album A Taste of Yesterday's Wine with Merle Haggard; while Jones, in the wake of his condition, appeared underweight on the album cover, his singing was flawless.  His run of hits also continued in the early 1980s, with the singer charting "I'm Not Ready Yet", "Same Ole Me" (backed by the Oak Ridge Boys)", "Still Doin' Time", "Tennessee Whiskey", "We Didn't See a Thing" (a duet with Ray Charles), and "I Always Get Lucky with You", which was Jones's last number one in 1984.

In 1981, Jones met Nancy Sepulvado, a 34-year-old divorcée from Mansfield, Louisiana. Sepulvado's positive impact on Jones's life and career cannot be overstated. She eventually cleaned up his finances, kept him away from his drug dealers (who reportedly kidnapped her daughter in retaliation), and managed his career. Jones always gave her complete credit for saving his life. Nancy, who did not drink, explained to Nick Tosches in 1994, "He was drinking but he was fun to be around. It wasn't love at first sight or anything like that. But I saw what a good person he was, deep down, and I couldn't help caring about him."  Jones managed to quit cocaine, but went on a drunken rampage in Alabama in fall 1983, and was once again straitjacketed and committed to Hillcrest Psychiatric Hospital suffering from malnutrition and delusions.  By that time, though, physically and emotionally exhausted, he really did want to quit drinking. In March 1984 in Birmingham, Alabama – at the age of 52 – Jones performed his first sober show since the early '70s. "All my life it seems like I've been running from something," he told the United Press International in June. "If I knew what it was, maybe I could run in the right direction, but I always seem to end up going the other way."  Jones began making up many of the dates he had missed, playing them for free to pay back promoters, and began opening his concerts with "No Show Jones", a song he had written with Glen Martin that poked fun at himself and other country singers. Jones always stressed that he was not proud of the way he treated loved ones and friends over the years, and was ashamed of disappointing his fans when he missed shows, telling Billboard in 2006, "I know it hurt my fans in a way and I've always been sad about that, it really bothered me for a long time."

Mostly sober for the rest of the 1980s, Jones consistently released albums with Sherrill producing, including Shine On, Jones Country, You've Still Got A Place In My Heart, Who's Gonna Fill Their Shoes, Wine Colored Roses (an album Jones would tell Jolene Downs in 2001 was one of his personal favorites), Too Wild Too Long, and One Woman Man. Jones's video for his 1985 hit "Who's Gonna Fill Their Shoes" won the CMA award for Video of the Year  (Billy Sherrill makes a cameo as the bus driver).

Later years and death (1990–2013)

In 1990, Jones released his last proper studio album on Epic, You Oughta Be Here With Me. Although the album featured several stirring performances, including the lead single "Hell Stays Open All Night Long" and the Roger Miller-penned title song, the single did poorly and Jones made the switch to MCA, ending his relationship with Sherrill and what was now Sony Music after 19 years. His first album with MCA, And Along Came Jones, was released in 1991, and backed by MCA's powerful promotion team and producer Kyle Lehning (who had produced a string of hit albums for Randy Travis), the album sold better than his previous one had. However, two singles, "You Couldn't Get The Picture" and "She Loved A Lot In Her Time" (a tribute to Jones's mother Clara), did not crack the top 30 on the charts, as Jones lost favor with country radio, as the format was altered radically during the early 1990s. His last album to have significant radio airplay was 1992's Walls Can Fall, which featured the novelty song "Finally Friday" and "I Don't Need Your Rockin' Chair", a testament to his continued vivaciousness in old age. Despite the lack of radio airplay, Jones continued to record and tour throughout the 1990s and was inducted into the Country Music Hall of Fame by Randy Travis in 1992. In 1996, Jones released his autobiography I Lived To Tell It All with Tom Carter, and the irony of his long career was not lost on him, with the singer writing in its preface, "I also know that a lot of my show-business peers are going to be angry after reading this book. So many have worked so hard to maintain their careers. I never took my career seriously, and yet it's flourishing."  He also pulled no punches about his disappointment in the direction country music had taken, devoting a full chapter to the changes in the country music scene of the 1990s that had him removed from radio playlists in favor of a younger generation of pop-influenced country stars. (Jones had long been a critic of country pop, and along with Wynette and Jean Shepard, he was one of the major backers of the Association of Country Entertainers, a guild promoting traditional country sounds that was founded in 1974; Jones's divorce from Wynette was a factor in the association's collapse.) Despite his absence from the country charts during this time, latter-day country superstars such as Garth Brooks, Randy Travis, Alan Jackson, and many others often paid tribute to Jones, while expressing their love and respect for his legacy as a true country legend who paved the way for their own success. On February 17, 1998, The Nashville Network premiered a group of television specials called The George Jones Show, with Jones as host.  The program featured informal chats with Jones holding court with country's biggest stars old and new, and of course, music. Guests included Loretta Lynn, Trace Adkins, Johnny Paycheck, Lorrie Morgan, Merle Haggard, Billy Ray Cyrus, Tim McGraw, Faith Hill, Charley Pride, Bobby Bare, Patty Loveless, and Waylon Jennings, among others.

While Jones remained committed to "pure country", he worked with the top producers and musicians of the day and the quality of his work remained high. Some of his significant performances include "I Must Have Done Something Bad", "Wild Irish Rose", "Billy B. Bad" (a sarcastic jab at country music establishment trendsetters), "A Thousand Times A Day", "When The Last Curtain Falls", and the novelty "High-Tech Redneck". Jones's most popular song in his later years was "Choices", the first single from his 1999 studio album Cold Hard Truth. A video was also made for the song, and Jones won another Grammy for Best Male Country Vocal Performance. The song was at the center of controversy when the Country Music Association invited Jones to perform it on the awards show, but required that he perform an abridged version. Jones refused and did not attend the show. Alan Jackson was disappointed with the association's decision, and halfway through his own performance during the show, he signaled to his band and played part of Jones's song in protest.

On March 6, 1999, Jones was involved in an accident when he crashed his sport utility vehicle near his home. He was taken to the Vanderbilt University Medical Center (VUMC), where he was released two weeks later. In May of that year, Jones pleaded guilty to drunk-driving charges related to the accident.  (In his memoir published three years earlier, Jones admitted that he sometimes  had a glass of wine before dinner and that he still drank beer occasionally, but insisted, "I don't squirm in my seat, fighting the urge for another drink" and speculated, "perhaps I'm not a true alcoholic in the modern sense of the word. Perhaps I was always just an old fashioned drunk.")  
The crash was a significant turning point, as he explained to Billboard in 2006: "when I had that wreck, I made up my mind, it put the fear of God in me. No more smoking, no more drinking. I didn't have to have no help, I made up my mind to quit. I don't crave it." After the accident, Jones went on to release The Gospel Collection in 2003, for which Billy Sherrill came out of retirement to produce.  He appeared at a televised Johnny Cash Memorial Concert in Jonesboro, Arkansas, in 2003, singing "Big River" with Willie Nelson and Kris Kristofferson. In 2008, Jones received the Kennedy Center Honor along with Pete Townshend and Roger Daltrey of The Who, Barbra Streisand, Morgan Freeman, and Twyla Tharp. President George W. Bush disclosed that he had many of Jones's songs on his iPod. Jones also served as judge in 2008 for the 8th annual Independent Music Awards to support independent artists' careers.  and Rolling Stone named him number 43 in their 100 Greatest Singers of All Time issue. An album titled Hits I Missed and One I Didn't, in which he covered hits he had passed on, as well as a remake of his own "He Stopped Loving Her Today", would be released as his final studio album. In 2012, Jones received the Grammy Lifetime Achievement award.

On March 29, 2012, Jones was taken to the hospital with an upper respiratory infection. Months later, on May 21, Jones was hospitalized again for his infection and was released five days later. On August 14, 2012, Jones announced his farewell tour, the Grand Tour, with scheduled stops at 60 cities. His final concert was held in Knoxville at the Knoxville Civic Coliseum on April 6, 2013.

Jones was scheduled to perform his final concert at the Bridgestone Arena on November 22, 2013. However, on April 18, 2013, Jones was taken to VUMC for a slight fever and irregular blood pressure. His concerts in Alabama and Salem were postponed as a result. Following six days in intensive care at VUMC, Jones died on April 26, 2013, at age 81.  Former First Lady Laura Bush was among those eulogizing Jones at his funeral on May 2, 2013. Other speakers were Tennessee Governor Bill Haslam, former Arkansas Governor Mike Huckabee, news personality Bob Schieffer, and country singers Barbara Mandrell and Kenny Chesney. Alan Jackson, Kid Rock, Ronnie Milsap, Randy Travis, Vince Gill, Patty Loveless, Travis Tritt, the Oak Ridge Boys, Charlie Daniels, Wynonna, and Brad Paisley provided musical tributes.  The service was broadcast live on CMT, GAC, RFD-TV, The Nashville Network and FamilyNet as well as Nashville stations. SiriusXM and WSM 650AM, home of the Grand Ole Opry, broadcast the event on the radio. The family requested that contributions be made to the Grand Ole Opry Trust Fund or to the Country Music Hall of Fame and Museum.

Jones was buried in Woodlawn Cemetery in Nashville. His death made headlines all over the world; many country stations (as well as a few of other formats, such as oldies/classic hits) abandoned or modified their playlists and played his songs throughout the day. The week after Jones's death, "He Stopped Loving Her Today" re-entered the hot country songs at number 21.

Legacy

Jones tirelessly defended the integrity of country music, telling Billboard in 2006, "It's never been for love of money. I thank God for it because it makes me a living. But I sing because I love it, not because of the dollar signs."  Jones also went out of his way to promote younger country singers that he felt were as passionate about the music as he was. "Everybody knows he's a great singer," Alan Jackson stated in 1995, "but what I like most about George is that when you meet him, he is like some old guy that works down at the gas station...even though he's a legend!"

Shortly after Jones's death, Andrew Mueller wrote about his influence in Uncut, "He was one of the finest interpretive singers who ever lifted a microphone...There cannot be a single country songwriter of the last 50-odd years who has not wondered what it might be like to hear their words sung by that voice."  In an article for The Texas Monthly in 1994, Nick Tosches eloquently described the singer's vocal style: "While he and his idol, Hank Williams, have both affected generations with a plaintive veracity of voice that has set them apart, Jones has an additional gift—a voice of exceptional range, natural elegance, and lucent tone. Gliding toward high tenor, plunging toward deep bass, the magisterial portamento of his onward-coursing baritone emits white-hot sparks and torrents of blue, investing his poison love songs with a tragic gravity and inflaming his celebrations of the honky-tonk ethos with the hellfire of abandon."  In the New Republic essay "Why George Jones ranks with Frank Sinatra and Billie Holiday," David Hajdu writes:

"Jones had a handsome and strange voice. His singing was always partly about the appeal of the tones he produced, regardless of the meaning of the words. In this sense, Jones had something in common with singers of formal music and opera, though his means of vocal production were radically different from theirs. He sang from the back of his throat, rather than from deep in his diaphragm. He tightened his larynx to squeeze sound out. He clenched his jaw, instead of wriggling it free. He forced wind through his teeth, and the notes sounded weirdly beautiful."

David Cantwell recalled in 2013, "His approach to singing, he told me once, was to call up those memories and feelings of his own that most closely corresponded to those being felt by the character in whatever song he was performing. He was a kind of singing method actor, creating an illusion of the real." In the liner notes to Essential George Jones: The Spirit of Country Rich Kienzle states, "Jones sings of people and stories that are achingly human. He can turn a ballad into a catharsis by wringing every possible emotion from it, making it a primal, strangled cry of anguish". In 1994, country music historian Colin Escott pronounced, "Contemporary country music is virtually founded on reverence for George Jones. Walk through a room of country singers and conduct a quick poll, George nearly always tops it." Waylon Jennings expressed a similar opinion in his song "It's Alright": "If we all could sound like we wanted to, we'd all sound like George Jones." In the wake of Jones's death, Merle Haggard pronounced in Rolling Stone, "His voice was like a Stradivarius violin: one of the greatest instruments ever made."  Emmylou Harris wrote, "When you hear George Jones sing, you are hearing a man who takes a song and makes it a work of art – always," a quote that appeared on the sleeve of Jones's 1976 album The Battle. In the documentary Same Ole Me, several country music stars offer similar thoughts. Randy Travis: "It sounds like he's lived every minute of every word that he sings and there's very few people who can do that"; Tom T. Hall: "It was always Jones who got the message across just right"; and Roy Acuff: "I'd give anything if I could sing like George Jones". 
In the same film, producer Billy Sherrill states, "All I did was change the instrumentation around him. I don't think he's changed at all."

Jones was the subject of the second season of the podcast Cocaine and Rhinestones, which contends Jones is the greatest country music singer ever.

Influence beyond country music
Unlike some of his contemporaries, Jones painstakingly adhered to country music. He never reached the top 40 of the Billboard Hot 100 and almost never had any of his music played on mainstream popular music stations in his career, but, ironically, without even trying, Jones's unabashed loyalty to strictly country arrangements attracted the admiration of musicians and songwriters from a wide range of genres. In an often-quoted tribute, Frank Sinatra called Jones "the second-best singer in America". In a Rolling Stone interview in 1969, Bob Dylan was asked what he thought was the best song released in the previous year, and he replied, "George Jones had one called 'Small Time Laboring Man'," and in his autobiography Chronicles, Dylan states that in the early 1960s, he was largely unimpressed by what he heard on the radio, and admits "Outside of maybe George Jones, I didn't listen to country music either."  Country rock pioneer Gram Parsons was an avid George Jones fan and covered Jones's song "That's All It Took" on his first solo album. In the documentary Gram Parsons: Fallen Angel, famous rock groupie Pamela Des Barres recalls seeing Parsons singing Jones's song "She Once Lived Here" at an empty Whisky a Go Go in Los Angeles: "It was my peak, peak moment, not sitting on Jimmy Page's amp...that was my peak moment."  Parsons reignited Keith Richards' interest in country music in the early '70s, and after Jones's death in 2013, the guitarist wrote, "He possessed the most touching voice, the most expressive ways of projecting that beautiful instrument of anyone I can call to mind. You heard his heart in every note he sang."  Richards recorded "Say It's Not You" with Jones for The Bradley Barn Sessions in 1994, and recalls in his autobiography hearing him sing for the first time when the Rolling Stones and Jones were on the same show in Texas in 1964: "They trailed in with tumbleweed following them, as if tumbleweed was their pet. Dust all over the place, a bunch of cowboys, but when George got up, we went whoa, there's a master up there." In the documentary The History of Rock 'N' Roll, Mick Jagger also cites Jones as one of his favorite country singers.

John Prine mentions Jones in his song "Jesus the Missing Years" and "Knockin' on Your Screen Door". Jones fan Elvis Costello had a surprise hit in the UK when he covered "A Good Year for the Roses" in 1981. Elliott Smith told an interviewer about his idea of Heaven: "George Jones would be singing all the time. It would be like New York in reverse: people would be nice to each other for no reason at all, and it would smell good."  In a 2001 interview with Mark Binelli from Rolling Stone, Leonard Cohen asked, "Have you heard George Jones's last record Cold Hard Truth?  I love to hear an old guy lay out his situation. He has the best voice in America."  The day Jones died, Cohen performed "Choices" on stage in Winnipeg, Canada, as a tribute to the country legend. In 2013, Robbie Robertson told Uncut, "He was the Ray Charles of country music – the one who could make you cry with his voice...We wouldn't listen to country music, the guys in The Band, but we'd listen to George Jones..."  Robert Plant told Uncuts Michael Bonner in 2014, "I now have to listen to George Jones once a day. Amazing singer. What a singer."  James Taylor, who wrote "Bartender's Blues" with Jones in mind and sang background vocals with him on the recording, told Rolling Stone, "He sounds like a steel guitar. It's the way he blends notes, the way he comes up to them, the way he crescendos and decrescendos. The dynamic of it is very tight and very controlled – it's like carving with the voice."  Other disparate artists who recorded with Jones include Dennis Locorriere and Ray Sawyer of Dr. Hook, Mark Knopfler, the Staple Singers, Leon Russell, B.B King, Blackberry Smoke, The Grateful Dead, and Linda Ronstadt. In 1995, Burt Reynolds wrote, "He is to country music what Spencer Tracy is to movies."

Duets
Jones was one of the greatest harmony singers in country music, and released many duets over the course of his long career. While his songs with Tammy Wynette are his most celebrated, Jones claimed in his autobiography that he felt his duets with Melba Montgomery were his best. Jones also recorded duet albums with Gene Pitney and his former bass player Johnny Paycheck. George's record with Paycheck, 1980's Double Trouble, is one of his most atypical records, and features him giving credible performances on  numbers such as "Maybelline" and "You Better Move On". Jones also recorded the duet albums My Very Special Guests (1979), A Taste of Yesterday's Wine with Merle Haggard (1982), Ladies Choice (1984), Friends In High Places (1991), The Bradley Barn Sessions (1994), God's Country: George Jones And Friends (2006), a second album with Merle Haggard called Kickin' Out The Footlights...Again (2006), and Burn Your Playhouse Down (2008).

Discography

Number-one country hits
 "White Lightning" (1959)
 "Tender Years" (1961)
 "She Thinks I Still Care" (1962)
 "Walk Through This World with Me" (1967)
 "We're Gonna Hold On" (with Tammy Wynette) (1973)
 "The Grand Tour" (1974)
 "The Door" (1975)
 "Golden Ring" (with Tammy Wynette) (1976)
 "Near You" (with Tammy Wynette) (1977)
 "He Stopped Loving Her Today" (1980)
 "Still Doin' Time" (1981)
 "Yesterday's Wine" (with Merle Haggard) (1982)
 "I Always Get Lucky with You" (1983)

See also

 Academy of Country Music
 Country Music Association
 Inductees of the Country Music Hall of Fame (1992 inductee)
 List of best-selling music artists
 List of country musicians

References

Further reading
 Jones, George, with Tom Carter, I Lived to Tell it All, Dell Publishing, 1997, .
 .
 .
 Joel Whitburn's Top Country Songs, 1944 to 2005, Record Research, Menomonee Falls, WI, 2005, .

External links 
 
 
 
 

1931 births
2013 deaths
American acoustic guitarists
American country singer-songwriters
American rockabilly guitarists
American country guitarists
American male singer-songwriters
Country Music Hall of Fame inductees
Epic Records artists
Gold Star Records artists
Grammy Lifetime Achievement Award winners
Grand Ole Opry members
Kennedy Center honorees
Mercury Records artists
Singer-songwriters from Texas
People from Beaumont, Texas
People from Hardin County, Texas
Starday Records artists
United Artists Records artists
United States Marines
United States National Medal of Arts recipients
Country musicians from Texas
Guitarists from Texas
American male guitarists
Baptists from Texas
20th-century American guitarists
People from Tyler County, Texas
People from Jasper, Texas
20th-century Baptists
20th-century American male singers
20th-century American singers